Parang Chandong (also spelled as Parang Candong, Parang Candung, Duku Candong or Duku Candung) is a traditional chopper used by the Dayak people (Iban people) of the Baram River in Borneo.

The Parang Candung is also the primary weapon of Sari Panji, a character in the Rajé Ngalam tale of Sambas Regency, West Kalimantan, Indonesia.

Recently in the west, the Parang Chandong was popularized by Raymond Mears and is sometimes referred to as Ray Mears Parang.

This parang is also not to be confused with the Candung in Lampung language, which refers to another type of golok in Lampung, Indonesia.

Description
The blade's edge is convex. The back is concave and curves towards the edge at the point. The centre of gravity lies near to the tip. The wooden scabbard's two parts are held together by means of rattan strips. The scabbard may be finely decorated, for instance with open-work carvings of floral motifs.

See also

 Parang (knife)

References

Indonesian culture
Weapons of Indonesia
Weapons of Malaysia
Machetes
Borneo